Alan Michael Smith (born 1 September 1950) is an English former amateur footballer who played as a winger in the Football League for York City, and in non-League football for Harrogate Railway Athletic, Bradford Park Avenue, Bridlington Town, Ossett Albion and Harrogate Town. He joined Harrogate as player-manager in 1979, before retiring from playing in 1984. He served as general manager from 1990 to 1991 before taking as team manager again in 1994.

References

1950 births
Living people
Sportspeople from Harrogate
English footballers
Association football forwards
Harrogate Railway Athletic F.C. players
York City F.C. players
Bradford (Park Avenue) A.F.C. players
Bridlington Town A.F.C. players
Ossett Albion A.F.C. players
Harrogate Town A.F.C. players
English Football League players
English football managers
Harrogate Town A.F.C. managers
Footballers from Yorkshire
Association football midfielders